Dimyidae is a family of extremely flattened, small (<1 cm), pleurothetic, relatively rare  marine bivalve molluscs in the order Pectinida inhabiting the deeper regions of continental shelves from the Caribbean to Japan. They are sometimes called dimyarian oysters.  Unlike other ostreoids, the dimyarian oysters attach themselves to a substrate via their right (rather than left) valves.  They are related to the scallops and other oysters.

Genera
Genera within Dimyidae include:
 Basiliomya Bayer 1971
 Basiliomya goreaui F. M. Bayer, 1971
 Dimya roualt 1848
 Dimyella Moore 1969
 Dimyella starcki D. R. Moore, 1969

References

 Moore, D.R., 1969. A New Genus and Species of Dimyidae from the caribbean Coast of Mexico. Journal de Conchyliologie 107: 137-141